The Calumet Mountains are a mountain range in San Bernardino County, California. They are north of Joshua Tree National Park and adjacent to the Sheep Hole Mountains in the Mojave Desert.

Sheephole Valley Wilderness Area
The Bureau of Land Management designated and manages the Sheephole Valley Wilderness Area, which includes the Calumet Mountains, within Mojave Trails National Monument. Sheephole Valley Wilderness Area  The 194,861-acre (approximate) Sheephole Valley Wilderness is a perfect representation of the basin and range topography typical in the Mojave Desert. The area consists of the northwest to southeast trending granitic boulder strewn Calumet Mountains and Sheep Hole Mountains, and is adjacent to the northern boundary of Joshua Tree National Park.

References

External links
Official Sheephole Valley Wilderness Area website
Sheephole Valley Wilderness photographs
Sheephole Valley Wilderness Area Map
Bird Checklist for Joshua Tree National Park

Mountain ranges of the Mojave Desert
Mountain ranges of San Bernardino County, California
Mojave Trails National Monument
Protected areas of the Mojave Desert
Protected areas of San Bernardino County, California
Bureau of Land Management areas in California
Mountain ranges of Southern California